Brockholes is a nature reserve near Preston, Lancashire, England, just off Junction 31 of the M6 motorway.  It is owned by the Wildlife Trust for Lancashire, Manchester and North Merseyside.  Situated in the flood-plain of the river Ribble, it has the UK's first floating visitor village.

Brockholes was previously a major quarry extraction site.  The land was bought by the Trust in January 2007, and the reserve opened to the public at Easter 2011. It has been regenerated as a mosaic of key habitats such as pools, reedbeds and woodland. The reserve is aimed less at dedicated bird-watchers and nature lovers than the general public of the big cities. The riverbank is covered in steaming ferns and rampant Himalayan balsam.

Brockholes offers a wide range of events throughout the year and over 250 acres of trails and hides. It has already seen record numbers of breeding wading birds along with visitors such as osprey, otter and bittern.

Visitor Village
In July 2007 an architectural design competition managed by RIBA Competitions invited architects and architect-led multidisciplinary design teams to design the new visitor facilities for the Brockholes Wetland and Woodland Nature Reserve. A design by Adam Khan Architects, working with Price & Myers, was selected by the wildlife trust and its partners. Work commenced in 2009.

The resulting Brockholes Visitor Village is the first floating visitor centre in the UK. It houses shops, an exhibition area, an activity room for schools and community groups, a restaurant and a conference centre. It has won national recognition, receiving: 
 the special award for sustainability in the 2012 Civic Trust Awards.
 the "Commercial & Public Access" category in the 2011 Wood Awards.

References

External links

Lancashire, Manchester and North Merseyside Wildlife Trust website

Birdwatching sites in England
Nature reserves in Lancashire
Parks and commons in Preston
Recipients of Civic Trust Awards
2011 establishments in England
Protected areas established in 2011